Frederick Hitch, VC (29 November 1856 – 6 January 1913) was an English recipient of the Victoria Cross for his actions at the Battle of Rorke's Drift, the highest award for gallantry in the face of the enemy that can be awarded to British and Commonwealth forces.

Details
Born in Southgate, in Middlesex, he joined the British Army and served as a private in the 2nd Battalion, 24th Regiment of Foot (later The South Wales Borderers). Frederick Hitch was illiterate, and when he joined the army he signed the official enlistment forms with a cross [X]. During the Anglo-Zulu War, aged 22, he fought at the Battle of Rorke's Drift (22–23 January 1879), and was awarded the VC for his actions. The citation was published in the London Gazette:

The soldiers were assisted in passing out ammunition by Padre George Smith. Hitch was severely wounded during the action, and was still in the Royal Victoria Military Hospital, Netley, Southampton when he received his medal from Queen Victoria. He was one of the eleven recipients of the VC awarded for their part in the battle.

Later life

Hitch's wounds were so severe that they led to his discharge from service. He then moved from job to job, unable to perform manual work due to the damage to his arm he had received during the battle. He married in 1883, but reportedly found life difficult living on his disability pension from the government, which amounted to just £10 a year. In 1901, whilst climbing a ladder he suffered a fall.  When he awoke in hospital his VC, which he always wore, had been stolen. Another version is that he was given a position in Whitehall as a ceremonial guard and his VC was cut off his chest and he was knocked to the ground.  In this version his VC was replaced by the regiment. His missing VC later reappeared at auction and was bought by Hitch's descendants for £85. Both the original and the replacement are in the regimental museum.

Forced to pay for a new one from his own pocket, Hitch also lost his job soon afterwards when he was accused of faking the fall to hide the fact that he had sold his medal to raise funds. This has never been proven. Hitch had eight children, and managed to land a steady job as driver of a smart horse-drawn cab (pulled by his own pair of horses), which he later exchanged for a motor taxi cab. This provided him with a comfortable income for some years.

Death
By the time of his death in 1913, Hitch was living alone in Chiswick, West London at 62 Cranbrook Road where he is commemorated with a blue plaque from English Heritage. He collapsed and died at his home whilst talking to a neighbour.  He was buried in St Nicholas' churchyard in Chiswick, with full military honours. His funeral was attended by a large number of London 'cabbies' and he is commemorated by the Fred Hitch Gallantry Award for cab drivers.

Memorial

He is buried in the centre of the churchyard of St Nicholas Church, Chiswick. The grave is difficult to miss since it is more of a monument than a grave, featuring a helmet on top. The memorial was paid for by subscriptions to a well-supported fund established shortly after Hitch's death by Chiswick's Urban District Council. Notable subscribers including leading Chiswick figures, Mayors of the London Boroughs of Hammersmith, of Kensington, and of Poplar, four MPs and the wealthy banker Leopold de Rothschild. Additional funds came from a donation by the American producer, Joseph Menchen, of the proceeds of a screening of the world's first all-colour feature film.  Menschen opened London's newly built Picture House cinema, at 166 Oxford Street, with The Miracle and gave the takings of its first matinee to Hitch's memorial fund.

The medal
His Victoria Cross is displayed at the Regimental Museum of The Royal Welsh, Brecon, Powys, Wales.

Legacy

Hitch was portrayed by David Kernan in the 1964 film Zulu.

References
Notes

Citations

External links
Pte. Frederick Hitch (biography, photos, memorial details)
Location of grave and VC medal (W. London)

Frederick Hitch (detailed biography, history, and Rorke's Drift)

1856 births
1913 deaths
People from Southgate, London
Anglo-Zulu War recipients of the Victoria Cross
British recipients of the Victoria Cross
South Wales Borderers soldiers
British Army personnel of the Anglo-Zulu War
British Army recipients of the Victoria Cross
Military personnel from Middlesex